Tim Griffin is an American writer, curator and former editor. He served as the director and chief curator of the Kitchen. He was editor-in-chief of Artforum from 2003 to 2010.

Biography 
Griffin received his B.A. from Columbia University, summa cum laude, in 1992. At Columbia, he was a student of French philosopher and critic Sylvère Lotringer. He then received his MFA from the Milton Avery Graduate School of the Arts of Bard College in 1999. He worked as a musician, playing trumpet in several ensembles, a theater producer and an art curator before entering journalism as the art editor at Time Out New York.

From 2003 to 2010, Griffin was editor in chief of Artforum and was credited for transforming the magazine's art criticism into social, political and intellectual movements. He was editor at large of the magazine until joining experimental art center the Kitchen as director and chief curator in 2011. As director, Griffin oversaw projects by artists including Chantal Akerman, Charles Atlas, and Gretchen Bender. He also developed new initiatives and programs including the L.A.B., an interdisciplinary discussion series. He stepped from the directorship down in 2021.

Griffin is married to Johanna Burton, director of the Museum of Contemporary Art, Los Angeles.

He was named a Chevalier of the Ordre des Arts et des Lettres by the French government in 2015.

References 

Living people
American curators
Columbia College (New York) alumni
Bard College alumni
Museum directors
American editors
Ohio State University faculty
Chevaliers of the Ordre des Arts et des Lettres
Year of birth missing (living people)